The 1926 Loyola Wolf Pack football team was an American football team that represented Loyola College of New Orleans (now known as Loyola University New Orleans) as an independent during the 1926 college football season. In its first and only season under head coach Eddie Reed, the team compiled a 10–0 record, shut out seven of ten opponents, and outscored all opponents by a total of 355 to 30. 

Quarterback Bucky Moore, sometimes known as Buck Moore or the "Dixie Flyer", left halfback Resney Gremillion, and Aubrey Budge led the team on offense.

Schedule

References

Loyola
Loyola Wolf Pack football seasons
College football undefeated seasons
Loyola Wolf Pack football